Narcissus hedraeanthus is a species of the genus Narcissus (daffodils) in the family Amaryllidaceae. It is classified in Section Bulbocodium, and is among the smallest species in that genus. It flowers in December.

Description 
Narcissus hedraeanthus is 5 – 8 cm in height, the sessile flowers which are up facing and pale yellow have a perianth 5 mm wide with a corona 7 mm by 10 mm. The exserted stamens are orange. The flowers are fragrant.

Distribution 
The natural distribution range is the Sierra de Cazorla in Spain.

References

Bibliography 
 John W. Blanchard: Narcissus. A Guide to Wild Daffodils, Alpine Garden Society, Woking 1990.
 Dumont's Gartenhandbuch: Blumenzwiebeln und Knollen, Dumont Buchverlag, Köln 1998, .
 Walter Erhardt: Narzissen - Osterglocken, Jonquillen, Tazetten, Ulmer Verlag, Stuttgart 1993, .

hedraeanthus
Garden plants
Flora of Spain